Moses Lamidi (born 5 January 1988) is a German-Nigerian professional footballer who plays as a forward for German club Ratingen 04/19.

Early life
Lamidi was born in Lagos, Nigeria. He began his career in Alemannia Aachen's youth team and signed 2003 an youth contract for Borussia Mönchengladbach. In summer 2006 he was promoted to the reserve team.

Club career
Lamidi started his professional career with Borussia Mönchengladbach, making his first appearance on 31 March 2007 in the Bundesliga against Eintracht Frankfurt. On 1 March 2010, the director of sport of Borussia Mönchengladbach, Max Eberl, announced that Lamidi's contract will not be renewed. The 22-year-old Nigerian played with the club since 2003 and has played 13 Bundesliga games. On 18 May 2010, he signed a two-year contract for Rot-Weiß Oberhausen.

On 10 July 2015, Lamidi signed a contract with Danish 1st Division-side Vejle BK. He lefft the club in 2016.

International career
Between 2008 and 2010 Lamidi played five games for the Germany national under-20 football team and scored one goal.

References

External links
 
 

1988 births
Living people
Nigerian emigrants to Germany
Naturalized citizens of Germany
Sportspeople from Lagos
German footballers
Association football forwards
Germany youth international footballers
Bundesliga players
2. Bundesliga players
Regionalliga players
Danish 1st Division players
Alemannia Aachen players
Borussia Mönchengladbach players
Borussia Mönchengladbach II players
Rot-Weiß Oberhausen players
Karlsruher SC players
FSV Frankfurt players
KFC Uerdingen 05 players
BSV Schwarz-Weiß Rehden players
Vejle Boldklub players
FC Kray players
SSVg Velbert players
German expatriate footballers
German expatriate sportspeople in Denmark
Expatriate men's footballers in Denmark